Idrissou Mora-Kpai (born 14 July 1967), is a Beninese filmmaker. He is most notable as the director of critically acclaimed films Indochina Traces of a Mother, Arlit The Second Paris, and Si-Gueriki The Queen Mother.  He is a recipient of the Dutch Prince Claus Award for his artistic achievements dedicated to promote social change in the Global South.

Personal life
He was born on 14 July 1967 in Béroubouay, Northern Benin to a family of commercial cattle farmers. His father was Mora-Kpai Sounon Dangnon and mother was Bougnon Yarou Signangui.

He graduated with B.A degree at the Konrad Wolf Film University of Babelsberg, Germany. He also worked as a visiting lecturer at Cornell University, Duke University and the University of Pittsburgh. Currently he lives in the US. He is an Assistant Professor in the Department of Media Arts, Sciences and Studies at Ithaca College.

Career
At the age of 13, he moved to Cotonou and attended high school. At the age of 19, he went to Algeria and then emigrated via Italy to Germany. Then he studied North American Studies at the Free University of Berlin from 1988 to 1993. After the graduation, he studied film production at the Konrad Wolf Film University from 1994 to 1999. During this university period, he made several two short films, Transient and Fake Soldiers.

In 1999, Idrissou moved to Paris and founded a production company called 'MKJ Films'. With the production house, he made his maiden documentary, Si-Gueriki in 2002. The film received critical acclaim and international attention. It was screened at the International Film Festival Rotterdam (IFFR), Cinema du Réel, Paris and the Copenhagen International Film Festival (CIFF). The film later awarded Best Documentary Award at the Festival International du Film Francophone de Namur.

In 2019, he made the documentary film America Street. It explores the daily struggles of an African-American community in Charleston, South Carolina after the 2015 Walter Scott killing. The film received critical acclaim and was screened at several film festivals.

Filmography

See also
 Cinema of Africa
 Cinema of Benin

References

External links
 

Living people
Beninese film directors
Beninese academics
1967 births
Ithaca College faculty